Yurlov is a Russian masculine surname, its feminine counterpart is Yurlova. It may refer to
Daria Yurlova (born 1992), Estonian biathlete
Ekaterina Yurlova (born 1985), Russian biathlete
Lyudmila Yurlova (1972–2016), Russian ice hockey forward
Marina Yurlova (1900–1984), Russian child soldier and author

Russian-language surnames